Primož Gliha (born 8 October 1967) is a Slovenian professional football coach and former player who last managed Kosovo national team as caretaker.

International career
On 3 June 1992, Gliha made his debut with Slovenia in a friendly match against Estonia after being named in the starting line-up. On 8 February 1994, he scored his first goal for Slovenia in his third appearance in a 1–0 home win over Georgia. Gliha also scored a hat-trick on 2 April 1997 in a 3–3 draw against Croatia in the 1998 FIFA World Cup qualifications. His last international match was on 14 October 1998 against Latvia in Maribor.

Managerial career

Kosovo
On 22 February 2021, the Football Federation of Kosovo appointed Gliha as the assistant manager of the Kosovo national team.

On 19 October 2021, Gliha confirmed through an interview that he would be Kosovo's caretaker manager for the November matches against Jordan and Greece, after the previous manager Bernard Challandes was sacked. On 5 November 2021, he made his first squad announcement with Kosovo for the friendly match against Jordan and the 2022 FIFA World Cup qualification match against Greece. Five days later, Gliha had his first match as Kosovo manager in a 2–0 home defeat against Jordan.

Personal life
During 1987 and 1988, Gliha was a soldier in the military service in Slatina Air Base in Kosovo within the Yugoslav People's Army. His son Erik Gliha is also a professional footballer.

References

External links
Primož Gliha at the Football Association of Slovenia 

1967 births
Living people
Footballers from Ljubljana
Slovenian footballers
Yugoslav footballers
Association football forwards
Slovenian expatriate footballers
NK Olimpija Ljubljana (1945–2005) players
GNK Dinamo Zagreb players
Yokohama Flügels players
NK Krka players
NK Mura players
NK Ljubljana players
Yugoslav Second League players
Yugoslav First League players
Slovenian PrvaLiga players
ND Gorica players
Slovenia international footballers
Zalaegerszegi TE players
Chamois Niortais F.C. players
Hapoel Beit She'an F.C. players
Hapoel Tel Aviv F.C. players
Bnei Sakhnin F.C. players
Expatriate footballers in Japan
Slovenian expatriate sportspeople in Japan
Expatriate footballers in France
Slovenian expatriate sportspeople in France
Expatriate footballers in Israel
Slovenian expatriate sportspeople in Israel
Expatriate footballers in Austria
Slovenian expatriate sportspeople in Austria
Expatriate footballers in Hungary
Slovenian expatriate sportspeople in Hungary
Liga Leumit players
Nemzeti Bajnokság I players
Slovenian football managers
NK Olimpija Ljubljana (2005) managers
ND Gorica managers
ND Mura 05 managers
Slovenian expatriate football managers
Expatriate football managers in Kosovo
Kosovo national football team managers
Slovenian expatriate sportspeople in Kosovo